The Thailand Champions Cup (continuing Kor Royal Cup, a different competition from the Thai Super Cup) is a single-game competition between the winners of previous Thai League 1 and Thai FA Cup, organised by the Football Association of Thailand. If the Thai League 1 champions also won the FA Cup, then the league runners-up provide the opposition. The first edition started in 2017 in order to replace the Kor Royal Cup.

Participating clubs
Under the normal circumstances, the following clubs participate:
 Defending Thai League 1 champions
 Defending Thai FA Cup winners

Venues

Permanent venues
Since 2017, Thailand Champions Cup has been at a permanent home rather than guest venues.
 Supachalasai Stadium: 2017–2018
 Thai Army Sports Stadium: 2019
 SCG Stadium: 2020
 700th Anniversary Stadium: 2021
 80th Birthday Stadium: 2022

Results

(also see champions history wherein Thailand Champions Cup continues the competition Kor Royal Cup, which was folded in 2016)

Results by club

References

Football cup competitions in Thailand
Recurring sporting events established in 2017
2017 establishments in Thailand